Amadio is a name. People with the name include:

Surname
 Bruno Amadio (1911–1981), Italian painter
 Dave Amadio (1939–1981), Canadian ice hockey player
 Greg Amadio (born 1981), Canadian ice hockey defenceman
 John Amadio (1883–1964), Australian flute player
 Ligia Amadio, Brazilian conductor
 Marco Amadio (born 1999), Italian footballer
 Michael Amadio (born 1996), Canadian ice hockey center
 Neville Amadio (1913–2006), Australian flute player
 Norman Amadio (1928–2020), Canadian jazz pianist, teacher, and composer
 Remo Amadio (born 1987), Italian footballer
 Roberto Amadio (born 1963), Italian sports manager and cyclist
 Silvio Amadio (1926–1995), Italian film director and screenwriter
 Stefano Amadio (born 1989), Italian footballer

Given name
 Amadio Freddi (1570–1634), Italian composer

Precedents
 Commercial Bank of Australia Ltd v Amadio, 1983 High Court of Australia judgement

See also
 Amadeo (disambiguation)
 Amadeus (disambiguation)
 Amedeo, given name

Italian-language surnames